Peltidium is a prodorsal shield found in animals of the Subphylum Chelicerata, in the Phylum Arthropoda. In some groups (Schizomida, Palpigradi, Solpugida and Opiliones) the peltidium, also known as schizopeltid, can be subdivided in: propeltidium, a carapace-like shield that covers the proterosoma, which comprises the fused acron (protocerebral region) and first four segments; and two free segments, mesopeltidium and metapeltidium (Online Dictionary of Invertebrate Zoology).

External links 
Online Dictionary of Invertebrate Zoology

References

Chelicerate anatomy